Xihe is a station on Line 4 of the Chengdu Metro in China. It is the eastern terminus of Line 4.

Station layout

Gallery

References

Railway stations in Sichuan
Railway stations in China opened in 2017
Chengdu Metro stations